Sir Denis Eustace Gilbert Malone (24 November 1922 – 2000) was a British jurist in the Caribbean.

He graduated from Wycliffe College in 1941. He was commissioned a flight sergeant in the Royal Air Force on 15 May 1945. He served as Solicitor-General of Barbados, and then in February 1961 was appointed a Puisne Judge of the Supreme Court of British Honduras (today Belize). He rose to Chief Justice of Belize in 1974 until his replacement in 1977 by Albert Staine, who became the first native of Belize to hold that position. He was knighted in the 1977 Silver Jubilee and Birthday Honours.

He went on to serve on the Supreme Court of the Bahamas as a Justice from May 1979 to September 1983, Acting Chief Justice from September to December 1983, and Senior Justice from January 1984 to November 1989. Afterwards, he became Chief Justice of the Cayman Islands; in 1991, he called for more court facilities to handle the rising backlog of civil and criminal cases.

He was married to Diana. They had no children. Sir Denis father had been Chief Justice of the Leeward islands. He had two brothers.

He died in Poole, Dorset, in 2000.

References

1922 births
2000 deaths
Chief justices of the Bahamas
Chief justices of Belize
Chief justices of the Cayman Islands
Caymanian judges
Knights Bachelor
Solicitors General of Barbados
People educated at Wycliffe College, Gloucestershire
British judges on the courts of Belize
British judges on the courts of the Bahamas
British Honduras judges
Colony of Barbados people
Date of death missing
Royal Air Force personnel of World War II
Royal Air Force airmen